Matts is a male given name. Notable people with this name include:

Surname
 Alfred Matts (1893–1970), English cricket player
 Peter W. Matts (1814–1903), American politician

Given name
 Matts Björk (1867–1936), Finnish lawyer and politician
 Matts Dumell (born 1952), Finnish journalist
 Matts Kunding, Irish football player
 Matts Kurck, also known as Matti Kurki, Finnish chieftain
 Matts Olsson (born 1988), Swedish alpine ski racer